Mike Anthony Gipson (born June 25, 1966) is an American politician currently serving in the California State Assembly. He is a Democrat representing the 64th Assembly District, which encompasses portions of the South Bay region of Los Angeles County, including Compton, Carson, Willowbrook, and the Watts neighborhood of Los Angeles.

Gipson is a member of the California Legislative Black Caucus. Prior to being elected to the Assembly in 2014, he was served on the Carson City Council.

Electoral history

2014 California State Assembly

2016 California State Assembly

2018 California State Assembly

2020 California State Assembly

References

External links 
 
 Join California Mike Gipson

Democratic Party members of the California State Assembly
Living people
People from Carson, California
African-American state legislators in California
California city council members
University of Phoenix alumni
1966 births
21st-century American politicians
21st-century African-American politicians
20th-century African-American people